In artificial immune systems, clonal selection algorithms are a class of algorithms inspired by the clonal selection theory of acquired immunity that explains how B and T lymphocytes improve their response to antigens over time called affinity maturation. These algorithms focus on the Darwinian attributes of the theory where selection is inspired by the affinity of antigen-antibody interactions, reproduction is inspired by cell division, and variation is inspired by somatic hypermutation. Clonal selection algorithms are most commonly applied to optimization and pattern recognition domains, some of which resemble parallel hill climbing and the genetic algorithm without the recombination operator.

Techniques 
CLONALG: The CLONal selection ALGorithm
AIRS: The Artificial Immune Recognition System
BCA: The B-Cell Algorithm

See also 
Artificial immune system
Biologically inspired computing
Computational immunology
Computational intelligence
Evolutionary computation
Immunocomputing
Natural computation
Swarm intelligence

Notes

External links 
Clonal Selection Pseudo code on AISWeb
CLONALG in Matlab developed by Leandro de Castro and Fernando Von Zuben
Optimization Algorithm Toolkit in Java developed by Jason Brownlee which includes the following clonal selection algorithms: Adaptive Clonal Selection (ACS), Optimization Immune Algorithm (opt-IMMALG), Optimization Immune Algorithm (opt-IA), Clonal Selection Algorithm (CLONALG, CLONALG1, CLONALG2), B-Cell Algorithm (BCA), Cloning, Information Gain, Aging (CLIGA), Immunological Algorithm (IA)
AIRS in C++ developed by Andrew Watkins
BCA in C++ developed by Johnny Kelsey

Genetic algorithms
Artificial immune systems